Yang Yuliang (born November 1952) is a Chinese chemist and educator. He is a member of Chinese Academy of Sciences. He formerly served as president of Fudan University between January 14, 2009 to October 24, 2014.

Biography
Yang was born and raised in Haiyan County, Zhejiang. After high school, he studied, then taught, at Fudan University. In 1986, he was a postdoctoral researcher under the direction of Spiess, at Max Planck Institute for Polymer Research.

Yang returned to China in 1988 and that year taught at Fudan University, he was promoted to professor in 1993, becoming its vice-President in 1999.

He was appointed as a Chang Jiang Scholar by the Ministry of Education of the People's Republic of China in 1999.

He was elected a fellow of the Chinese Academy of Sciences in 2003.

On January 14, 2009, he was appointed president of Fudan University, serving until October 24, 2014.

Now he is the Dean of the Chinese Ancient Books Protection Research School of Fudan University.

References

1952 births
Living people
Chemists from Zhejiang
Educators from Jiaxing
Fudan University alumni
Max Planck Institute for Polymer Research alumni
Max Planck Society alumni
Members of the Chinese Academy of Sciences
Presidents of Fudan University
Scientists from Jiaxing